Abacetus diversus is a species of ground beetle in the subfamily Pterostichinae. It was described by Peringuey in 1899.

References

diversus
Beetles described in 1899